Laze, rendered in Chinese as Lare (拉热) and Shuitianhua (水田话), is a language of the Naish subbranch of the Naic group of languages, spoken in Muli County, western Sichuan, China.

Laze is spoken by less than 300 fluent speakers in Xiangjiao Township 项脚乡 within Muli County (Michaud & Jacques 2012).

Name
The name Laze is likely to be a place name.

Further reading
Publications are available on: 
 an outline of Laze phonology, lexicon and grammar 
 Laze phonemes: vowels, consonants, syllable structure 
 the historical phonology of Laze, Na and Naxi 
 the Laze tone system 

Recordings in Laze are available from the Pangloss Collection (an online archive of languages).

References

Qiangic languages
Languages of China